Various lists regarding the political institutions of ancient Rome are presented. Each entry in a list is a link to a separate article. Categories included are: constitutions (5), laws (5), and legislatures (7); state offices (28) and office holders (6 lists); political factions (2 + 1 conflict) and social ranks (8). A political glossary (35) of similar construction follows.

Laws
 Roman law
 List of Roman laws
 Twelve Tables
 Digest of Roman law
 Corpus Juris Civilis

Legislatures
 Roman Senate
 Roman assemblies
 Roman Curia
 Comitia curiata
 Comitia centuriata
 Comitia tributa
 Concilium plebis

Religious Institutions
 Roman Catholic Church

State offices

Lists of individual office holders
 List of Roman kings
 List of Roman Consuls
 List of Roman Emperors
 List of principes senatus
 List of Roman censors
 List of Roman governors of Britain

Political factions
 Optimates
 Populares

(also see Conflict of the Orders)

Social ranks
 Nobles
 Patricians
 Equites
 Plebs
 Adsidui
 Proletarians
 Capite censi
 Slaves

Glossary of law and politics
 
 
 
 
 
 
 
 
 
 
 
 
 a

See also

Notes

Ancient Roman government
Roman law
Ancient Rome-related lists
Political systems
Tetrarchy